Chiswick Records was a British independent record label. Established in 1975, Chiswick was the "first true 'indie' label to be established in Britain for nearly a decade". The label has been described as "significant" in the "punk era". It released some of the earliest records recorded by The Hammersmith Gorillas, The Count Bishops, Motörhead, Joe Strummer’s The 101ers, The Damned, Skrewdriver, Billy Bragg, Kirsty MacColl, and Shane MacGowan.

History
The label was started by Ted Carroll and Roger Armstrong in 1975 as a subsidiary of Rock On Records. Shortly after Trevor Churchill joined, it was incorporated into Swift Records Ltd. Two years later it entered into a licensing deal with EMI. Subsidiary Ace Records was started in 1978, and Chiswick Records closed in 1983; its back catalogue is still owned by Ace Records Ltd.

The label released a number of sampler compilation albums showcasing their bands. These included Submarine Tracks & Fool's Gold (Chiswick Chartbusters Volume One) (1977) and Long Shots, Dead Certs And Odds On Favourites (Chiswick Chartbusters Volume Two) (1978).

Artists released

 Albania
 The Damned
 Amazorblades
 The Count Bishops
 Edith Nylon
 Dr. Feelgood (Fast Women and Slow Horses album) (1982)
 Drug Addix (with Kirsty MacColl on backing vocals)
 The Gorillas
 Jakko
 Jeff Hill
 Johnny Moped
 Johnny & the Self Abusers
 Little Bob Story
 Matchbox
 Motörhead
 The Nipple Erectors
 The 101ers
 The Radiators from Space/The Radiators (Dublin)
 Radio Stars
 Riff Raff (with Billy Bragg)
 The Rings (with Twink)
 Sniff 'n' the Tears
 Rocky Sharpe and the Replays
 Skrewdriver
 T. V. Smith
 The Table
 Whirlwind

See also 
 Lists of record labels

References

External links
 A history of Chiswick Records

British record labels
Record labels established in 1975
Record labels disestablished in 1983